Krishnaswamy Kasturirangan (born 24 October 1940) is an Indian space scientist who headed the Indian Space Research Organisation (ISRO) from 1994 to 2003. He is presently Chancellor of Central University of Rajasthan and NIIT University. He is the former chancellor of Jawaharlal Nehru University and the chairman of Karnataka Knowledge Commission. He is a former member of the Rajya Sabha (2003–09) and a former member of the now defunct Planning Commission of India. He was also the director of the National Institute of Advanced Studies, Bangalore, from April 2004 to 2009. He is a recipient of the three major civilian awards from the Government of India: the Padma Shri, the Padma Bhushan and the Padma Vibhushan.

Early life and education

Early life 
Kasturirangan was born on 24 October 1940, at Ernakulam in the erstwhile Kingdom of Cochin, to C. M. Krishnaswamy Iyer and Visalakshi. Kasturirangan's forefathers hailed from Tamil Nadu and later settled down in different parts of Kerala; his maternal forefathers settled in Nallepalli Agraharam, in Chittur taluk, Palakkad district and his paternal forefathers settled in the town of Chalakudy, near Thrissur. Kasturirangan's maternal grandfather Sri Ananthanarayana Iyer completed his school and college education and became a sanitary inspector in Ernakulam. He was well-respected in the community for his discipline and integrity. He and his wife Narayani had four daughters and a son, the eldest of whom was Visalakshi.

Kasturirangan's paternal grandfather, Chalakudy Manikam Iyer, being mindful of the importance of education, ensured that all his sons received a sound education up to graduation. Kasturirangan's father was a graduate in chemistry from Maharaja's College, Ernakulam. He worked in a variety of administrative capacities at Tata Airlines and retired as a senior accountant officer at the Indian Airlines Corporation. Kasturirangan and his brother Ravi spent their early childhood in Ernakulam in the care of their maternal grandparents after the death of their mother. At the age of ten, after the sudden death of his grandfather, he joined his father in Bombay (now Mumbai) along with his brother.

Shortly after completing his PhD in 1969, Kasturirangan married Lakshmi. They have two sons, Rajesh and Sanjay. His wife died in 1991.

Education
Kasturirangan did his schooling at Sree Rama Varma High School. Kasturirangan graduated in science with honours from Ramnarain Ruia College, Mumbai, and obtained his Master of Science degree in physics from the University of Mumbai. He received his Doctorate Degree in experimental high energy astronomy in 1971, working at the Physical Research Laboratory, Ahmedabad. He has published more than 240 papers in the areas of astronomy, space science and applications.

Key contributions
Kasturirangan served as Chairman of the Indian Space Research Organisation for 9 years, Chairman of Space Commission and Secretary to the Government of India in the Department of Space, before laying down his office on 27 August 2003. 
In ISRO he served as the director of ISRO Satellite Centre, overseeing the development of new generation spacecraft, the Indian National Satellite System (INSAT-2), the Indian remote sensingsatellites (IRS-1A and -1B) as well as scientific satellites. He was also the project director for India's first two experimental earth observation satellites, Bhaskara-I and II.

Under his leadership, the programme witnessed several major milestones including the successful launching and operationalisation of the India's prestigious launch vehicles, the Polar Satellite Launch Vehicle and the Geosynchronous Satellite Launch Vehicle (GSLV). Studies on the advanced version of the GSLV, GSLVMk-III, were also completed, including defining its full configuration. Further, he also oversaw the development and launching of THE remote sensing satellites, IRS-1C and IRS-1D, realisation of new generation INSAT communication satellites, besides ocean observation satellites IRS-P3 and -P4. He also led the initiative for India to enter the planetary exploration era by extensive studies leading to the definition of Chandrayaan-1. These efforts have put India as a pre-eminent space-faring nation among the handful of six countries that have major space programmes.  As an astrophysicist, Kasturirangan's interests include research in high energy X-ray and gamma-ray astronomy, as well as optical astronomy. Defining India's most ambitious space based high-energy astronomy observatory and initiating related activities was also an important milestone under his leadership. He has made extensive and significant contributions to studies of cosmic X-ray and gamma ray sources and effect of cosmic X-rays in the lower atmosphere.

Kasturirangan is head of a committee tasked with creating the National Education Policy 2020 for India. Later in September 2021, he was appointed as the head of a 12-member steering committee which would be responsible for developing a new National Curriculum Framework. This committee, having been given a tenure of 3 years, will be the guiding document for the development of textbooks, syllabi and teaching practices of schools across the country.

Kasturirangan also serves as a member of the board of trustees of the Raman Research Institute Trust, Bengaluru.

Honours and awards
Kasturirangan is the recipient of honorary doctorates from 27 universities.

Controversies
He was the superior officer of ISRO when Nambi Narayanan was accused of selling secrets to Pakistan. Kasturirangan's lack of help to the latter was noted in the movie Rocketry: The Nambi Effect.

References

External links
Dr. Kasturirangan's biodata at ISRO
India's Space Enterprise : A Case Study in Strategic Thinking and Planning

 

Recipients of the Padma Vibhushan in science & engineering
Recipients of the Padma Bhushan in science & engineering
Recipients of the Padma Shri in science & engineering
Living people
1940 births
Indian Space Research Organisation people
Nominated members of the Rajya Sabha
Indian institute directors
Members of the Planning Commission of India
Maharaja's College, Ernakulam alumni
Scientists from Kochi
20th-century Indian educational theorists
Educators from Kerala
20th-century Indian physicists
Recipients of the Rajyotsava Award 2014
Recipients of the Shanti Swarup Bhatnagar Award in Engineering Science